Afrosciadium gossweileri is a member of the carrot family, Apiaceae. It is a perennial tuberous herb, endemic to subtropical Angola.

Afrosciadium gossweileri was previously classified as Peucedanum gossweileri before the genus Afrosciadium was established in 2008.

References

Apioideae
Endemic flora of Angola
Plants described in 2008